{{DISPLAYTITLE:C18H24O5}}
The molecular formula C18H24O5 (molar mass: 320.38 g/mol, exact mass: 320.1624 u) may refer to:

 Zearalanone (ZAN)
 α-Zearalenol
 β-Zearalenol